The year 1942 in architecture involved some significant events.

Events
 April 25 – Marriage of English architects Jane Drew and Maxwell Fry in London.
 May 30/31 – Bombing of Cologne in World War II: The first 1,000 bomber raid and associated fires destroy 3,330 non-residential buildings and make 13,000 families homeless; eleven of the twelve Romanesque churches of Cologne are damaged.
 September – Alker Tripp publishes Town Planning and Road Traffic in England, advocating segregated roads.
 An abridged version of the Athens Charter by Le Corbusier is published.

Buildings and structures

Buildings
 October 10 – The Normandie Hotel in San Juan, Puerto Rico, designed by engineer Félix Benítez Rexach and architect Raúl Reichard, is opened.
 The National Naval Medical Center in Bethesda, Maryland, United States is completed.
 Walthamstow Town Hall in London, designed by Philip Hepworth in 1932, is completed.
 Wythenshawe Bus Garage in Manchester, England is completed.

Awards
 RIBA Royal Gold Medal – William Curtis Green.
 Grand Prix de Rome, architecture – Raymond Gleize?

Births
 January 19 – John Sheehy, American architect
 February 1 – Tonny Zwollo, Dutch-born architect
 March 23 – Fabio Reinhart, Swiss architect
 September 15 – Ksenia Milicevic, Yugoslav-born French painter, architect and town planner
 Patty Hopkins, born Patricia Wainwright, English architect
 Roger Walker, New Zealand architect

Deaths

 March 31 – Randall Wells, English Arts and Crafts architect (born 1877)
 May 17 – Mārtiņš Nukša, Latvian architect and diplomat (born 1878; executed)
 May 20 – Hector Guimard, French-born Art Nouveau architect (born 1867)
 May 23 – C. R. Ashbee, English interior designer (born 1863)
 June 25 – Arthur Anderson, Australian architect (born 1868)
 July 24 – Sir Edwin Cooper, English architect (born 1874)
 September 22 – Ralph Adams Cram, American collegiate and ecclesiastical architect (born 1863)
 December 8 – Albert Kahn, German American industrial architect (born 1869)
 December 13 – Robert Robinson Taylor, first accredited African-American architect (born 1868)
 December 27 – Reginald Blomfield, English architect (born 1856)
 Ernest George Trobridge, British architect (born 1884)

References